Harold James Leddy (1893–1971) was an Australian rugby league footballer who played in the 1910s and 1920s.

Playing career
Leddy played nine seasons with Western Suburbs from 1915 to 1924. He also represented New South Wales in 1921 and 1923.  He was part of the Western Suburbs team which finished as runners up in 1918.

Death
Leddy died on 7 May 1971, aged 78.

References

1893 births
1971 deaths
Western Suburbs Magpies players
Australian rugby league players
Rugby league second-rows
Rugby league locks
New South Wales rugby league team players